The 1980 German Grand Prix was a Formula One motor race held at the Hockenheimring on 10 August 1980. It was the ninth round of the 1980 Formula One season. The race was the 42nd German Grand Prix and the fifth to be held at Hockenheim.

The race was won by Jacques Laffite driving a Ligier. Laffite won by three seconds over Carlos Reutemann driving a Williams. Third was Reutemann's teammate Alan Jones.

Report
The very high speed Hockenheimring favored more powerful turbocharged engines, and was expected to be a circuit suited to Renault. They were followed by René Arnoux in the other Renault, Jones's Argentine teammate Carlos Reutemann, French driver Jacques Laffite, Brazilian Nelson Piquet (Brabham), Frenchman Didier Pironi (Ligier), and Finn Keke Rosberg in a Fittipaldi.

Jean-Pierre Jabouille led early with Arnoux third behind Jones. Both Renaults suffered engine failures within a lap of each other leaving Jones to lead until he made a pitstop following a tyre puncture after the second chicane, dropping him behind Laffite and Reutemann.

Laffite won the race, his first of 1980, and fourth overall. He was followed by Carlos Reutemann and Alan Jones. Nelson Piquet finished fourth in his Brabham ahead of the only Alfa Romeo entered, that of Bruno Giacomelli. Canadian Gilles Villeneuve collected just his fourth point for the year in the blighted Ferrari. In his 100th race start, West German driver Jochen Mass finished eighth in his Arrows, behind Mario Andretti (Lotus).

Jones expanded his points lead over Piquet to seven. Reutemann was up to third, 15 points behind and Laffite was up to fourth, 16 points dows. The Renault drivers had faded and Ferrari drivers were completely out of the championship picture. Williams' lead over Ligier in the Constructors' Championship was now 19 points, with the rest over 30 points behind.

Classification

Qualifying

Race

Championship standings after the race

Drivers' Championship standings

Constructors' Championship standings

Note: Only the top five positions are included for both sets of standings.

References

German Grand Prix
German Grand Prix
German Grand Prix